The G. I. Taylor Professorship of Fluid Mechanics is a professorship in fluid mechanics at the University of Cambridge. It was founded in 1992 and named in honor of G. I. Taylor, after a fundraising campaign by George Batchelor.

Philip Saffman, a student of Batchelor and Taylor, was offered the chair in the 1990s. However, he turned it down. He stated later that he was "very tempted" by the offer, but that he was stopped by the difficulty of moving his family from California to England.

List of G. I. Taylor Professors of Fluid Mechanics 

 1992 – 1994 Grigory Barenblatt
 1996 – 2009 Tim Pedley FRS
 2010 – 2017, Paul Linden FRS
 2017 – present, Rich Kerswell FRS

References

Fluid Mechanics, Taylor, G. I.
School of Technology, University of Cambridge
Fluid Mechanics, Taylor, G. I., Cambridge
1992 establishments in England